is a railway station on the Tobu Tojo Line in Itabashi, Tokyo, Japan, operated by the private railway operator Tobu Railway.

Lines
Only "Local" (all-stations) services stop at this station, with eight trains per hour in each direction during the daytime.

Station layout

The station consists of a single island platform serving two tracks. Entrances are located on the north and south sides of the station. The station has universal access toilet facilities.

Platforms

History
It was renamed Tokiwadai on 1 October 1951.

From 17 March 2012, station numbering was introduced on the Tobu Tojo Line, with Tokiwadai Station becoming "TJ-06".

Passenger statistics
In fiscal 2010, the station was used by an average of 46,297 passengers daily.

Accidents
Tokiwadai Station suffers from a high number of suicides, due to the relatively high speed and frequency of non-stop trains passing through the station. Between 2002 and 2009, three people were killed by passing trains after jumping onto the tracks.

On 6 February 2007 at around 19:30, a police officer from a nearby Kōban police box was hit by a non-stop express train near Tokiwadai Station while trying to restrain a 39-year-old woman who had rushed onto the tracks in an attempt to commit suicide. The woman survived with serious injuries, but the 53-year-old police officer, Sergeant Kunihiko Miyamoto, was left critically injured in a coma and died on 12 February.

Surrounding area
 Poppins Nursery School (within station building, from 1 April 2012)
 Shinmei Shrine
 Itabashi-ku Chuo Library
 Itabashi-ku Tokiwadai Elementary School
 Nippon Shodo Museum

See also
 List of railway stations in Japan

References

External links

Tobu station information 

Tobu Tojo Main Line
Stations of Tobu Railway
Railway stations in Tokyo
Railway stations in Japan opened in 1935